Oulaya (‎; 4 November 1936 – 19 March 1990), born "Beya Bent Béchir Ben Hédi Rahal", was a Tunisian singer and actress.

References

External links 

 Foued Allani, « Laissez Aalli gara tranquille, SVP ! », La Presse de Tunisie, 11 mars 2010

1936 births
1990 deaths
20th-century Tunisian women singers
People from Tunis
20th-century Tunisian actresses